Impatient may refer to:

 "Impatient" (Anna Abreu song)
 "Impatient" (Jeremih song)
 "Impatient", a song by Blu Cantrell from the album Bittersweet

See also
 Impatiens, a genus of flowers